Abdy is a hamlet in South Yorkshire, England.

The earliest reference to Abdy is in the 13th century in the cartulary of Monk Bretton Priory. It is possible that it was founded as a medieval grange and that its name is derived from the French for abbey (in this case Monk Bretton Priory or Roche Abbey).

Earthworks for a Roman Ridge Dyke runs along the southern and eastern sides of Abdy. To the north of the village is Wath Golf Course.

References

Villages in South Yorkshire